Nikolasz Kovács (born 27 February 1999) is a Hungarian football player who plays for Paks.

Career

Budapest Honvéd
On 2 June 2018, Kovács played his first match for Budapest Honvéd in a 3-1 win against Vasas in the Hungarian League.

Paks
On 12 February 2022, Kovács moved to Paks on a three-year contract.

Club statistics

Updated to games played as of 15 May 2022.

References

External links
 
 

1999 births
People from Karcag
Sportspeople from Jász-Nagykun-Szolnok County
Living people
Hungarian footballers
Hungary youth international footballers
Association football forwards
Budapest Honvéd FC players
Balmazújvárosi FC players
FC Ajka players
Paksi FC players
Nemzeti Bajnokság I players
Nemzeti Bajnokság II players